The Parliament Building houses the National Assembly of Guyana, and is located in the capital Georgetown. The building was designed by Joseph Hadfield, and is located in Brickdam where the Court of Policy used to be. The building was completed on 21 February 1834. The Parliamentary Chamber contains a decorated ceiling designed by Cesar Castellani.

History
The Parliament Building replaced the former building of the Court of Policy. The building was built on a foundation of greenheart logs. The foundation stone was laid in 1829 and, on 21 February 1834, the structure, stuccoed to resemble stone blocks, was completed. 

After having been completed, the building was formally handed over to a committee of the Court of Policy on 5 August 1834.  Those present were Joseph Hadfield, of the Hadfield family, after one of whom, John, Hadfield Street was named; and George Booker, who represented J.D. Patterson, one of the three contractors, the other two being Roderick McKenzie and Hector Kemp.  The architect was Joseph Hadfield.  The building was constructed at a cost of 50,000 pounds using slave labour.

In 1875 Cesar Castellani completed the installation of a sunken panelled ceiling of the Parliamentary Chamber in the eastern wing of the Parliament Building. The Chamber also features an elaborately carved teak Speaker's chair, an Independence gift from the Government of India; a table and three chairs for the Clerks, and a Sergeant-at-Arms chair (an Independence gift from the British House of Commons); paintings of Arthur Chung, Guyana's first ceremonial President (1970-1980) and of Forbes Burnham, Guyana's first executive President (1980-1985); and a gilded clock, depicting the rays of the sun, a gift from the Demerara Company Limited.

The walls of the Parliament Chamber are paneled with mahogany. Floor length shuttered windows allow light and air to enter, and north-facing windows have small balconies.

The Parliament Building is an excellent example of 19th-century Renaissance architecture and is one of two domed buildings in Georgetown. Within its compound  are two cannon that were used in the Crimean War and a statue of Hubert Nathaniel Critchlow, OBE (1884-1958) who is regarded as the father of Trade Unionism in Guyana.

In 1998, the Parliament Library opened in the building. The ceiling suffered from the hot and humid climate, and was reconstructed between 2000 and 2005.

References

Government buildings completed in 1834
History of Guyana
Buildings and structures in Georgetown, Guyana
Government buildings in Guyana
Renaissance Revival architecture
Legislative buildings
Seats of national legislatures